Morgan Academy RFC was an amateur rugby union team based in Dundee, Scotland.

They competed in the  league until 2021 when Dundee HSFP and Morgan Academy RFC merged to create Dundee Rugby Club.

History

It was originally for the former pupils of Morgan Academy, a secondary school in Dundee. It was formed in 1933.

It was also known as Morgan Rugby Club or Morgan Dundee, having dropped the restriction on solely former academy pupils playing for the club.

Merger

The club merged with Dundee HSFP to form a new club Dundee Rugby in 2021. One of the main reasons for the merger was to consolidate rugby union club in Dundee and then attempt to get the new club into the professional Super 6 league.

Notable players

North and Midlands

The following former Morgan Academy RFC players have represented North and Midlands at provincial level.

Honours

 Crieff Sevens
 Champions: 1988
 Waid Academy Sevens
Champions: 1961, 1962, 1963, 1966, 1980, 1990
 Hillfoot Sevens
 Champions: 1990

References

Sources

 Massie, Allan A Portrait of Scottish Rugby (Polygon, Edinburgh)

Rugby union in Dundee
Rugby clubs established in 1933
Rugby union clubs disestablished in 2021
1933 establishments in Scotland
2021 disestablishments in Scotland
Defunct Scottish rugby union clubs